The Jinnah Antarctic Station is an Antarctic research station operated by the Pakistan Antarctic Programme. Located in East Antarctica, it lies in the vicinity of the Sør Rondane Mountains in Queen Maud Land, and is named after Muhammad Ali Jinnah.

History
In 1991, shortly after Pakistan became a member of the Scientific Committee on Antarctic Research, the Pakistan Antarctic Programme was launched by the National Institute of Oceanography under the Ministry of Science and Technology; it was led by the Pakistan Navy, which provided logistical support for the research effort as well as for the establishment of the Jinnah Antarctic Station. The first expedition landed on 15 January, before they formally established the summer research station (Jinnah I) on 25 January 1991.

Pakistan currently maintains one summertime research station and the Iqbal weather observatory in Queen Maud Land, a Norwegian-claimed Antarctic territory.

Facilities

The facilities were quickly expanded by the National Institute of Oceanography. Government advisors belonging to the Ministry of Science and Technology frequently visited the area. Pakistani naval engineers and scientists oversaw the development of the base. In 2001, the data operational system was linked to the Badr-B satellite, beginning regular transmission of digital imagery of the region to NIO headquarters in Karachi. In 2002, SUPARCO scientists visited the base, where they set up and installed an advanced, supercomputer-equipped facility, run by the NIO and SUPARCO's scientists. In 2005, Pakistan Air Force engineers and scientists built a small airstrip, and a control room to monitor flights to and from Pakistan. In 2010, Pakistan's government approved a plan to expand the JAS facility into a permanent operational base.

Foreign cooperation

United States 
Communication gears were set up with the United States Antarctic Program.

As part of a joint effort with the United States, the Jinnah Antarctic Station is frequently visited by American scientists who conduct research with their Pakistani counterparts.

See also
 List of Antarctic research stations
 List of Antarctic field camps

References

External links
 National Institute of Oceanography Pakistan

Pakistan Antarctic Programme
Nawaz Sharif administration
History of science and technology in Pakistan
1991 establishments in Antarctica
Memorials to Muhammad Ali Jinnah